Andreas Kaufmann (born 6 October 1973) is a German former professional footballer who played as a defender. He made his debut on the professional league level in the Bundesliga with SC Freiburg on 22 September 2001 when he came on as a substitute in the 90th minute of a game against Schalke 04.

References

1973 births
Living people
German footballers
Association football defenders
SC Freiburg players
Bundesliga players
2. Bundesliga players